Yang Haoyu (born 31 July 2000) is a Chinese footballer currently playing as a left-back for Hubei Istar.

Club career
On 8 October 2020 Yang Haoyu was loaned out to top tier club Dalian Pro for the 2020 Chinese Super League season. While he would not make any appearances for Dalian he would loaned out to them again for the following season and he would make his debut for the club on 22 April 2021 in a league game against Changchun Yatai F.C. in a 3-1 defeat.

Career statistics
.

References

External links

2000 births
Living people
Chinese footballers
Association football defenders
Chinese Super League players
Vitória S.C. players
Padroense F.C. players
Gondomar S.C. players
Dalian Professional F.C. players
Chinese expatriate footballers
Chinese expatriate sportspeople in Portugal
Expatriate footballers in Portugal